Weifang World Kite Museum is a museum in the Kuiwen District of Weifang, China. First opened in 1989, it has twelve galleries with models and kites from China's ancient past to modern times and kites from around the world.

Weifang is renowned as the "World Capital of Kites".

References

External links
  

Kite museums
Museums in Shandong
1989 establishments in China